Nowy Port is a district of the city of Gdańsk, Poland. It borders with Brzeźno to the west, Letnica to the south, and Przeróbka to the east (over the Martwa Wisła).

The landmark of the district is the historic Nowy Port Lighthouse, which is open to visitors.

During World War II, in 1939 and 1940, the district was one of places of imprisonment and executions of Polish railway workers by Nazi Germany.

Population
With 10684 inhabitants and area of 2.28 km², its population density was 4689/km², as of 2011. By 2019 the population fell to 9334, giving a population density of 4500/km².

Gallery

Sport
Portowiec Gdańsk is the local sports club.

References

External links
 Map of Nowy Port

Districts of Gdańsk